Pilula praetumida is a species of small air-breathing land snail, a terrestrial pulmonate gastropod mollusk in the family  Charopidae. This species is endemic to Réunion.

References

Endemic fauna of Réunion
Molluscs of Réunion
Pilula
Taxonomy articles created by Polbot